Ladislaus of Hungary may refer to:

Ladislaus I of Hungary
Ladislaus II of Hungary
Ladislaus III of Hungary
Ladislaus IV of Hungary
Ladislaus V of Hungary (disambiguation)
Ladislaus the Bald